The men's high jump event  at the 1994 European Athletics Indoor Championships was held in Palais Omnisports de Paris-Bercy on 12 and 13 March.

Medalists

Results

Qualification
Qualification performance: 2.26 (Q) or at least 12 best performers (q) advanced to the final.

Final

References

Final results

High jump at the European Athletics Indoor Championships
High